Edward Jan Habich (31 January 1835, Warsaw – 31 October 1909, Lima, Peru) was a Polish engineer and mathematician. In 1876, he founded the National University of Engineering, a renowned engineering school in Lima, Peru. He was a member of the Peruvian Geographic Society and an Honorary Citizen of Peru. In his native Poland he took part in the January Uprising against the Russian Empire in 1863.

Burial
Edward Jan Habich is buried at the Cementerio Presbítero Matías Maestro, Lima, Peru.

Gallery

References

External links
 

1835 births
1909 deaths
Engineers from Warsaw
19th-century Polish scholars
Polish mathematicians
Emigrants from the Russian Empire to Peru